Gjallarbrú (literally "Gjöll Bridge") is a bridge in Norse mythology which  spans the river Gjöll in the underworld. It must be crossed in order to reach Hel.

According to Gylfaginning it is described as a covered bridge, "thatched with glittering gold". It figures most prominently in the story of Baldr, specifically when Hermód is sent to retrieve the fallen god from the land of the dead. When Hermód arrived at the bridge he was challenged by the giant maiden Módgud who demanded that he state his name and business before allowing him to pass.

References

Other sources
Bellows, Henry Adams (1923) The Poetic Edda  (American-Scandinavian Foundation)
 Orchard, Andy (1997) Dictionary of Norse Myth and Legend (Cassell) 
Simek, Rudolf (2007) translated by Angela Hall Dictionary of Northern Mythology (D.S. Brewer) 

Locations in Norse mythology
Mythological bridges
Norse underworld
Water in mythology